Plantation Estate is a single-story, wood-frame,  Pacific Ocean-front house at 57 Kailuana Place in Kailua, Honolulu County, Hawaii, which former President Barack Obama rented for use during his Christmas vacations from 2008 to 2016.

Obama exercised at the Semper Fit Center at the base and attended dinners there during his visits. He also swam in the ocean at the base of Pyramid Rock.

Obama visits

August 8–14, 2008 – Obama visited Kailua August 8–14 during the 2008 United States presidential election campaign staying at a different house belonging to Jill Tate Higgins, the general partner of Lakeside Enterprises, a Burbank, California private family investment company.  During the visit he made what would be his last visit with his grandmother Madelyn Dunham who had raised him in Honolulu from age 10 on.
December 20–31, 2008 – Obama in his first visit to Plantation Estate took a two-week vacation after winning the election.  Among the activities was the scattering of his grandmother's ashes at Lanai Lookout at the same location where he had scattered his mother Stanley Ann Dunham's ashes in 1995.  His grandmother had died two days before Obama's election.  Photographs of him shirtless on the beach were widely circulated.
December 24, 2009 – January 3, 2010 – During the visit he went to his maternal grandfather Stanley Armour Dunham's grave at National Memorial Cemetery of the Pacific.  Obama's trip was cut short after he dealt with the attempted Christmas bombing of Northwest Flight 253.  Obama was at the house from December 24 to January 3.
December 23, 2010 – January 3, 2011 – Obama arrived on December 23 for a planned 11-day visit.  His arrival was one day late because of the lame duck congress approval of the New START treaty.  Michelle Obama, Malia Obama and Sasha Obama and Bo (dog), left for Hawaii on December 18 flying on a C-40B Special Mission Aircraft.  Press reports indicated that her not flying with the President cost $63,000 to $100,000 additional for the trip.  He extended his departure date one day to January 4. During the vacation he made recess appointments of James M. Cole  to be United States Deputy Attorney General, William J. Boarman to Public Printer of the United States, Matthew Bryza to be United States Ambassador to Azerbaijan, Norman L. Eisen to be ambassador to the Czech Republic, Robert Stephen Ford to ambassador to Syria and Francis J. Ricciardone, Jr. to be United States Ambassador to Turkey.  During the trip Hawaii Governor Neil Abercrombie who knew Obama and his family as a child said he would seek to find a way to release the original birth certificate showing that Obama was born in Hawaii and not in Kenya as birthers have argued.  He also dined with his half sister Maya Soetoro-Ng at Alan Wong's Restaurant near his boyhood home in Honolulu.  Other destinations have been snorkeling with family at Hanauma Bay on a Tuesday when the bay is normally closed to tourists. Obama's reading list for the trip included The Thousand Autumns of Jacob de Zoet by David Mitchell, Our Kind of Traitor by John le Carré and President Reagan: The Role of a Lifetime by Lou Cannon.  Obama signed the James Zadroga 9/11 Health and Compensation Act of 2010 on January 2.
December 23, 2011 – Obama arrived six days after his family and stayed until January 1, 2012. Reportedly, this year's vacation home is a few doors down from the home used in the previous years.
December 21, 2012 – Obama arrived at the same house he stayed in 2011.

See also

 List of residences of presidents of the United States

References

External links
Paradisepointestates.com

Houses completed in 1946
Houses in Honolulu County, Hawaii
Barack Obama
1946 establishments in Hawaii